A total of 37 teams entered the 1954 FIFA World Cup qualification rounds, competing for a total of 16 spots in the final tournament. Switzerland, as the hosts, and Uruguay, as the defending champions, qualified automatically, leaving 14 spots open for competition.

37 teams were divided into 13 groups, based on geographical considerations, as follows:
 Groups 1 to 10 – Europe: 11 places, contested by 27 teams (including Egypt and Israel).
 Group 11 and 12 – The Americas: 2 places, contested by 7 teams.
 Group 13 – Asia: 1 place, contested by 3 teams.

A total of 33 teams played at least one qualifying match. A total of 57 qualifying matches were played, and 208 goals were scored (an average of 3.65 per match).

Listed below are the dates and results of the qualification rounds.

Groups
The 13 groups had different rules, as follows:
 Groups 1, 2, 4, 7, 8, and 10 had 3 teams each. The teams played against each other on a home-and-away basis. The group winners would qualify.
 Groups 5, 6 and 9 had 2 teams each. The teams played against each other on a home-and-away basis. The group winners would qualify.
 Group 3 had 4 teams. The teams played against each other once. The group winner and runner-up would qualify.
 Group 11 had 4 teams. The teams played against each other on a home-and-away basis. The group winner would qualify.
 Group 12 had 3 teams. The teams played against each other twice. The group winner would qualify.
 Group 13 had 3 teams. After Republic of China withdrew before the matches began, the remaining 2 teams played against each other twice. The group winner would qualify.

Group 1

 

West Germany qualified.

Group 2

 

 

 

 

 

Belgium qualified. 
This is the first time Sweden failed to qualify.

Group 3

This group was also the 1953–54 British Home Championship.

 

 

 

 

 

England and Scotland qualified.

Group 4

 

 

 

 

 

France qualified.

Group 5

 

Austria qualified.

Group 6

 

Spain and Turkey finished level on points, and a play-off on neutral ground was played to decide who would qualify.

Luigi Franco Gemma, a 14-year-old Italian boy whose father worked at the stadium, picked Turkey's name from the lots with his eyes blindfolded. Since the 1970 FIFA World Cup finals, goal difference has been used as a tiebreaker for future qualifying rounds. Had those rules been in place, Spain would have qualified, and Turkey would have been eliminated. This is the first time Spain failed to qualify.
Therefore, Turkey qualified. This was the only time winner of aggregate score failed to qualify.

Group 7

Poland withdrew and Iceland had their entry rejected so Hungary qualified automatically.

Group 8

 

 

 

 

 

Czechoslovakia qualified. This was the first time Romania failed to qualify.

Group 9

 

Italy qualified.

Group 10

 

 

 

 

 

Yugoslavia qualified.

Group 11

 

 

 

 

 

Brazil qualified. Despite having participated in every World Cup, this was the first time they played qualifying matches.

Group 12

 

 

 

 

 

Mexico  qualified.

Group 13

 

South Korea qualified.

Qualified teams

(h) – qualified automatically as hosts

(c) – qualified automatically as defending champions

(w) – qualified automatically because Poland withdrew

Goalscorers

6 goals

 Max Morlock

5 goals

 Erich Probst
 Baltazar
 Tomás Balcázar

4 goals

 Henri Coppens
 José Luis Lamadrid
 Nils-Åke Sandell
 Bill Looby

3 goals

 František Vlk
 Nat Lofthouse
 Kalevi Lehtovirta
 Just Fontaine
 Pedro Arnauda
 Manuel Lugo
 Choi Chung-Min
 Chung Nam-Sik
 John Charles

2 goals

 Léopold Anoul
 Mathieu Bollen
 Júlio Botelho
 Harold Hassall
 Dennis Wilshaw
 Olavi Lahtinen
 Jean Desgranges
 Pierre Flamion
 Léon Glovacki
 Roger Piantoni
 Joseph Ujlaki
 Jean Vincent
 Gerard Ellie
 Arthur Fitzsimons
 Reg Ryan
 Giampiero Boniperti
 Amleto Frignani
 Toshio Iwatani
 Alfredo Torres
 Peter McParland
 José Parodi
 József Pecsovszky
 Allan Brown
 Charlie Fleming
 Burhan Sargın
 Ivor Allchurch
 Fritz Walter

1 goal

 Robert Dienst
 Ernst Happel
 Ernst Ocwirk
 Theodor Wagner
 Victor Lemberechts
 Victor Mees
 Jean-Louis Straetmans
 Maurinho
 Stefan Bozhkov
 Ivan Kolev
 Dobromir Tashkov
 Ted Robledo
 Emil Pažický
 František Šafránek
 Ad-Diba
 Alaa El-Hamouly
 Ronnie Allen
 Ivor Broadis
 Jimmy Mullen
 Johnny Nicholls
 Nils Rikberg
 Jorma Vaihela
 Raymond Cicci
 Jacques Foix
 Édouard Kargu
 Raymond Kopa
 Armand Penverne
 Thanasis Bembis
 Georgios Kamaras
 Dimitris Kokkinakis
 George Cummins
 Tommy Eglington
 Frank O'Farrell
 Davy Walsh
 Ermes Muccinelli
 Egisto Pandolfini
 Eduardo Ricagni
 Ken Naganuma
 Antoine Kohn
 Rafael Ávalos
 Gregorio Gómez
 José Naranjo
 Nicolás Tellez
 Norman Lockhart
 Eddie McMorran
 Knut Dahlen
 Harald Hennum
 Hans Nordahl
 Gunnar Thoresen
 Ireneo Hermosilla
 Eulogio Martínez
 Silvio Parodi
 José Águas
 Valeriu Călinoiu
 Alexandru Ene
 Gavril Serfözö
 Herbert Binkert
 Herbert Martin
 Werner Otto
 Gerhard Siedl
 Jackie Henderson
 Bobby Johnstone
 Willie Ormond
 Lawrence Reilly
 Choi Kwang-Suk
 Rafael Alsua
 José Artetxe
 Adrián Escudero
 Agustín Gaínza
 Miguel González
 Venancio García
 Bengt Berndtsson
 Hans Persson
 Gösta Sandberg
 Herbert Sandin
 Arne Selmosson
 Recep Adanır
 Suat Mamat
 Cornelius Casey
 Efrain Chacurian
 Ruben Mendoza
 Helmut Rahn
 Horst Schade
 Hans Schäfer
 Ottmar Walter
 Frane Matošić
 Miloš Milutinović
 Todor Veselinović
 Branko Zebec

1 own goal

 William Scheppel (playing against Mexico)

Notes
 Turkey qualified via the drawing of lots, after they and Spain finished level on points in Group 6 and a drawn play-off match in Rome.
 For the first time, qualification matches were actually played in South America; in the four previous World Cups, the South American teams qualified automatically due to withdrawals (in the case of 1934) or through the South American Football Championship (for the 1938 and 1950 tournaments), while there was no qualifying process in 1930. Argentina did not take part in the qualification process.
 As the French-occupied Saarland protectorate did not become part of Germany until 1957, the Saarland national team entered their only World Cup competition and actually had to play Germany in the qualifiers.
The entries of Bolivia, Costa Rica, Cuba, Iceland, India and South Vietnam were rejected by FIFA.
 After being banned from the 1950 tournament following the Second World War, Germany and Japan were both allowed to play again. West Germany qualified and became champions after defeating Hungary with a score of 3–2 in the final that became known as the Miracle of Bern.

References

External links
FIFA World Cup Official Site – 1954 World Cup Qualification 
RSSSF – 1954 World Cup Qualification

 
Football World Cup
FIFA World Cup qualification